Shirakole Mahavidyalaya, established in 2007, is an undergraduate college in Sirakol, Usthi, West Bengal, India. This college is affiliated to the University of Calcutta..

Departments

Arts and Commerce
Bengali
English
Sanskrit
History
Geography
Political Science
Philosophy
Commerce

Accreditation
Shirakole Mahavidyalaya is recognized by the University Grants Commission (UGC).

See also 
List of colleges affiliated to the University of Calcutta
Education in India
Education in West Bengal

References

External links
Shirakole Mahavidyalaya

Educational institutions established in 2007
University of Calcutta affiliates
Universities and colleges in South 24 Parganas district
2007 establishments in West Bengal